General elections were held in Denmark on 15 November 1960. The Social Democratic Party remained the largest in the Folketing, with 76 of the 179 seats. Voter turnout was 86% in Denmark proper, 57% in the Faroe Islands and 66% in Greenland. They were the last elections in which the electoral threshold for the Danish seats was 60,000 votes. The following year the electoral law was amended to make it 2% of the vote.

Results

References

Elections in Denmark
Denmark
1960 elections in Denmark
November 1960 events in Europe